The Córdoba Cabildo was the Cabildo (colonial town hall) of Córdoba, Argentina.

Overview
The local government in Córdoba met in its members' private homes in the first years after the settlement's 1573 establishment. The first structure designated for the purpose was begun in 1588, and was a modest adobe and thatched roof structure typical of the colonial era in Spanish America. A framed wood structure designed by Alonso de Encinas replaced the precarious, initial cabildo in 1610.

Encinas' cabildo, which included only the Alcalde's office, living quarters and a small jail, was ordered replaced by a larger building in 1749 by the Alcade (Mayor), José Moyano Oscariz. The Governor of Córdoba appointed in 1783, the Marquess of Sobremonte, Rafael Núñez, prioritized the much delayed completion of the new Cabildo. He commissioned Juan Manuel López for the new project, which would feature a significantly larger office space, grand steps, a chapel, a patio, an archway of fifteen columns along the façade, and a covered arcade along the archway for the inclusion of storefronts. The greatly accelerated works were concluded in 1786, and would include the opening of the Santa Catalina Promenade between the cabildo and the recently built Córdoba Cathedral. 

Marble cladding and a bell tower were added in 1885, though the latter was removed during the cabildo's restoration in the late 1930s, when numerous historic structures in Argentina were restored to their approximate, original design by having such additions demolished. The Córdoba Cabildo, like the Cathedral, was declared a National Historic Monument in 1941. The city government was relocated to a Renaissance Revivalist structure late in the 19th century, and to a Modernist building (its current home) in the 1960s. A section of the historic cabildo remained in use by the Provincial Police Department of Information (DDI), however, and during the last dictatorship, this wing was used as one of over 300 detention centers operated by the regime during the Dirty War of the late 1970s.

The City Historical Museum was inaugurated at the cabildo in 1980.

References

Museo Histórico de la Ciudad  
Vigil, Carlos. Los Monumentos y lugares históricos de la Argentina. Buenos Aires: Editorial Atlántida, 1968.

 
Cabildos
Buildings and structures in Córdoba, Argentina
Government buildings completed in 1786
National Historic Monuments of Argentina
History museums in Argentina
Museums established in 1980
City museums
Museums in Córdoba Province, Argentina